José L. Ortiz (born October 2, 1993) is a Puerto Rican jockey who has been a rider on the New York Thoroughbred horse racing circuit since 2012. In 2016, he was the leading jockey in North America by number of wins, including his first win at the Breeders' Cup. In 2017, he earned the Eclipse Award for Outstanding Jockey after he led the earnings list and won his first Triple Crown race, the 2017 Belmont Stakes. In 2019, he won the Kentucky Oaks. In 2022, he won the Preakness Stakes, his second Triple Crown race win.

Personal life
Ortiz was born in Trujillo Alto, Puerto Rico, the son of Irad Ortiz and Vilma Morales Adomo. His grandfather, also named Irad Ortiz, was a jockey, as was uncle, Ivan Ortiz. He and his older brother from another mother, Irad Ortiz Jr., became interested in the sport from a young age, encouraged by family friend Efraim "Pito" Rosa and mentored by Hall of Fame rider Ángel Cordero Jr.
 
Ortiz attended Puerto Rico’s Escuela Vocacional Hípica, a school for prospective jockeys, then moved to the United States in 2012 to join Irad, who had already become a leading jockey. When Ortiz followed suit by becoming one of the leading apprentice jockeys of 2012, the two brothers quickly attracted attention. "They're doing this in New York – the Mecca of racing – two riders fighting for the title," said Pito in early 2013. "I don't remember ever seeing two brothers do that."  The brothers are highly competitive with each other, even when playing basketball or baseball or video games such as Gallop Racer. "That's just what we do," Ortiz said. "We've always competed, trying to beat each other. It's still fun. We're still very close. We share the same corner in the jockey's room in New York and when we get done racing, he usually stops by my house, just about every day."

Ortiz married jockey Taylor Rice on December 20, 2016. The two had a daughter, Leilani, in July 2017.

Career
Ortiz recorded his first win in Puerto Rico on January 7, 2012, at Hipodromo Camarero. Soon thereafter he moved to the U.S., where he recorded his first American win on March 13 at Parx Casino and Racing. On July 15, he suffered multiple injuries including a punctured lung after a fall. He returned to racing on August 26, and finished the year with 98 wins from 697 starts.

In 2013, he won 224 races including his first Grade I victory in the Hopeful Stakes with Strong Mandate. For the next two years, he maintained a consistent level of success with 234 wins in 2014 and 244 wins in 2015. In 2016 he had a breakthrough year with 351 wins, which Ortiz attributed to increased experience. Trainer Linda Rice, who is the aunt of Ortiz's wife, concurred. "He’s always been a very good speed rider but in the last year and a half, he’s not one dimensional," she said. "He’s a top rider period. He sees the race well. He’s extremely athletic and puts his horses in good position. He makes very few mistakes." Ortiz is known for his soft hands and ability to get horses to relax.

On July 28, 2016, Ortiz earned his 1,000th career win when he rode Moonlight Song to victory in the John Morrissey Stakes at Saratoga. He went on to win the Saratoga riding title with 65 wins. In November, Ortiz won his first Breeders' Cup race, the Juvenile Turf, aboard Oscar Performance. Ortiz went on to win his first New York Racing Association (NYRA) year-end title with 319 wins at Aqueduct, Belmont Park and Saratoga over the course of 2016. He finished 2016 in as the leading jockey in North America by number of wins and in third place by earnings. He was a finalist for the Eclipse Award for Outstanding Jockey, finishing third. "It was great to be among the final three with a Hall of Famer like Mike Smith and a future Hall of Famer in Javier (Castellano)," he said. "I'll keep working hard until I win it."

In 2017, Ortiz earned his first win in a Triple Crown race with Tapwrit in the Belmont Stakes. He was again the leading rider at Saratoga, highlighted by a victory on Elate in the Alabama Stakes. He won the Breeders' Cup Juvenile aboard Good Magic and finished the year as the leading jockey in the United States by earnings. He was voted the Eclipse Award for Outstanding Jockey. José Ortiz was on Good Magic during the Kentucky Derby and was spotted with a "Free Murdoc" strip on his leg.

Year-end charts

References

1993 births
Living people
Puerto Rican jockeys
People from Trujillo Alto, Puerto Rico
American Champion jockeys